Farmway LRT station (SW2) is an elevated Light Rail Transit (LRT) station on the Sengkang LRT line West Loop in Anchorvale, Sengkang, Singapore, located near Sengkang Riverside Park at Anchorvale Street near the junctions of Anchorvale Crescent and Anchorvale Road. It opened for passenger service on 15 November 2007 to facilitate the completion of Sengkang Sports Centre and Anchorvale Community Club within the vicinity.

Etymology

Reminiscent of its history as a farming area, Farmway formed part of old road names in the area, such as Punggol Farmways 1 and 2, Cheng Lim Farmways 1 to 6, Buangkok North Farmways 1 to 4 and Buangkok South Farmways 1 to 5.

References

External links

Railway stations in Singapore opened in 2007
LRT stations in Sengkang
Anchorvale
Light Rail Transit (Singapore) stations